Holly Jayne Stein is an American geologist who is a senior research scientist and a professor at Colorado State University. She established the AIRIE (Applied Isotope Research for Industry and the Environment) Program and has led the center since 1995. Her research focuses on the development of the rhenium-osmium (Re-Os) geochronometers. In 2015, she was elected Geochemistry Fellow of the European Association of Geochemistry.

Education 
Stein attended Western Illinois University and completed her bachelor’s degree there. She received her master’s and doctorate degrees from the University of North Carolina at Chapel Hill.

Research and Career 
Stein joined the Department of Geosciences at Colorado State University (CSU) as a senior research scientist in March 1998. She is a professor at CSU and Center for Earth Evolution and Dynamics at the University of Oslo, Norway.

Stein established AIRIE Program in 1995, which is located in CSU. She has been leading the team as a director to date. AIRIE develops Re-Os geochronology and applies the dating techniques to explore various fields ranging from mass extinction to energy resources. The team investigates metallogenesis on ore and petroleum deposits to understand their relationships to geologic processes. AIRIE is also known for its technology of dating molybdenite.

In 2004, Stein developed innovative pyrite Re-Os geochronology and contributed to revealing the presence of a significant amount of atmospheric oxygen in 2.32 billion years ago. Her geochronological analysis provided a better understanding of diverse sedimentary and paleoclimatology mechanisms.

Awards and honors 

 1992 Gilbert Fellowship from the United States Geological Survey
 1992 Outstanding Woman Alumna Award of Western Illinois University
 2000 Fulbright Research Fellowship
 2005 Silver Medal of the Society of Economic Geologists
 2008 Helmholtz-Humboldt Research Award
 2015 Geochemistry Fellow of the European Association of Geochemistry
 2016 Jules Braunstein Memorial Award of the American Association of Petroleum Geologists
 2020 Bunsen Medal in Geochemistry of the European Geosciences Union

Selected publications 
 Bekker, A., Holland, H., Wang, PL., Rumble III, D., Stein, H. J., Hannah, J. L., Coetzee, L. L., and Beukes, N. J., (2004), Dating the rise of atmospheric oxygen, Nature 427, 117–120. 
 Stein, H. J., Markey, R. J., Morgan, J. W., Hannah, J. L., and Scherstén, A., (2001), The remarkable Re–Os chronometer in molybdenite: how and why it works, Terra Nova 13, 479-486.

References 

American geologists
Western Illinois University alumni
University of North Carolina at Chapel Hill alumni
Colorado State University faculty
Academic staff of the University of Oslo
Geology award winners
American women geologists

Wikipedia Student Program
Living people

Year of birth missing (living people)